{{Taxobox
| image =
| image_width = 240px
| image_caption =
| regnum = Fungi
| divisio = Basidiomycota
| classis = Agaricomycetes
| ordo = Agaricales
| familia = Hymenogastraceae
| genus = Gymnopilus
| species = G. novoguineensis| binomial = Gymnopilus novoguineensis| binomial_authority = Hongo
| synonyms =
}}Gymnopilus novoguineensis' is a species of mushroom in the family Hymenogastraceae.

See also

List of Gymnopilus species

External linksGymnopilus novoguineensis'' at Index Fungorum

novoguineensis
Fungi of North America